Brighstoneus (after Brighstone, a village on the Isle of Wight) is a genus of hadrosauriform dinosaur from the Early Cretaceous Wessex Formation of the Isle of Wight, England. The genus contains a single species, Brighstoneus simmondsi, known from a partial skeleton.

History of discovery 
The holotype specimen, MIWG 6344, was discovered along with the holotype of Neovenator during the summer of 1978, when a storm made part of the Grange Chine collapse. Rocks containing fossils fell to the beach of Brighstone Bay on the southwestern coast of the Isle of Wight. The rocks were part of plant debris bed L9 within the variegated clays and marls of the Wessex Formation dating from the Barremian stage of the Early Cretaceous, about 125 million years ago. They were first collected by the Henwood family and shortly afterwards by geology student David Richards. Richards sent the remains to the Museum of Isle of Wight Geology and the British Museum of Natural History. In the latter institution paleontologist Alan Jack Charig determined that the bones belonged to two kinds of animal: Iguanodon and what would later become Neovenator. The "Iguanodon", later referred to Mantellisaurus, at first generated the most interest and in the early 1980s a team was sent by the BMNH to secure more of its bones. Amateur paleontologists Keith and Jenny Simmonds assisted in collecting remains.

Brighstoneus was found to be distinct from Mantellisaurus by 2019 when being studied by the retired physician Jeremy Lockwood cataloguing all iguanodontian fossils from Wight for his PhD study at the University of Portsmouth. The new taxon was named and described as the type species Brighstoneus simmondsi by Jeremy A.F. Lockwood, David Michael Martill and Susannah Maidment in 2021. The generic name refers to Brighstone, mentioning it was the residence of the nineteenth-century palaeontologist William Fox. The specific name honours Keith Simmonds as discoverer.

The holotype was discovered from strata of the Wessex Formation dating from the early Barremian, at least 125 million years old. Mantelisaurus is about four million years younger. The holotype consists of a partial skeleton with skull and lower jaws. It contains the right premaxilla, both maxillae, both jugal bones, the left palpebral, the predentary, both dentaries, eight back vertebrae, the sacrum, six tail vertebrae, fourteen ribs, both ilia, a possible prepubic process of the pubic bone, the right ischium and the right thighbone. The bones were not articulated but found intermingled with the Neovenator bones over a surface of six by five metres. They had been damaged by beetle larvae prior to fossilisation. Due to the confused discovery process, two vertebrae are in private possession and were not described in 2021.

Description
The describing authors indicated some distinguishing traits. Two of these were autapomorphies, unique derived characters, in this case relative to the Iguanodontia as a whole. The maxillary teeth (of the upper jaws) have a main ridge on the inner side with in front of it secondary ridges. Behind the nostril, the nasal bone is expanded to a swollen bulla with convex sides. The ridged inner maxillary tooth sides are shared with an as yet unprepared specimen from Wight, IWCMS 2001.445, that is possibly referable to Brighstoneus.

Additionally, a unique combination of traits is present, that in themselves are not unique for the Iguanodontia. The dentary of the lower jaw shows at least twenty-eight tooth positions. Each position has a functional tooth as well as a replacement tooth. The bone walls between the tooth sockets do not run parallel to each other.

Brighstoneus has an elongated and low bump on the snout, due to an abrupt transition of the higher front of the nasal bone into a lower rear. Along the back, a relatively high crest is present, reaching its tallest point over the tail base, where some neural spines equalled over 370% of the vertebral centrum height.

Classification
In 2021, Lockwood et al., placed Brighstoneus in the Iguanodontia. In most analyses, it was found to be more basal in the Hadrosauriformes, in a polytomy with related forms including the British Barilium, Hypselospinus, Iguanodon and Mantellisaurus. In an analysis excluding two new characters describing the nasal and ilium, resolution within Hadrosauriformes could be found, with Brightstoneus recovered outside of the Hadrosauriformes as a sister species of Ouranosaurus as seen below.

Paleoenvironment 
Brighstoneus is the third hadrosauriform taxon known from the upper Wealden Group, distinct from both Iguanodon and Mantellisaurus. The Wessex Formation had a warm and semi-arid Mediterranean climate, formed on alluvial meander plains. Forests on higher ground north of the floodplain consisted of Pinophyta, Ginkgophyta, Pteridophyta, Cycadophyta. Forest fires and floods were common occurrences, resulting in the formation of plant debris beds.

References 

Iguanodonts
Ornithischian genera
Barremian genera
Early Cretaceous dinosaurs of Europe
Cretaceous England
Fossils of England
Fossil taxa described in 2021